U.S. Route 266 (US 266) is a , east–west U.S. Numbered Highway in Okmulgee, McIntosh, and Muskogee counties in Oklahoma, United States, that connects U.S. Route 62 U.S. Route 75  (US 62/US 75) in Henryetta with U.S. Route 64 (US 62) in Warner. The highway no longer meets the former route of its parent, U.S. Route 66 (US 66), and is closely paralleled by Interstate 40 (I-40), which replaced US 266 (along with accompanying routes US 62 from Oklahoma City to Henryetta and US 64 from Warner to the Arkansas border west of Fort Smith, Arkansas) as the major east–west highway east of Oklahoma City during the 1960s.

Route description

The highway heads east from this point, quickly crossing into the town of Dewar, which it bisects. As it leaves Dewar, US 266 turns northeast, crossing Coal Creek and the Deep Fork River. The highway bypasses Hoffman to the east, providing access via Hoffman Road. The route then passes through the southeastern outskirts of Grayson. The highway then turns due east. Immediately after the curve, the highway serves as the southern terminus of Oklahoma State Highway 52's northern section. US 266 then continues east into McIntosh County.

US 266 continues due east, running parallel to the Deep Fork Arm of Eufaula Lake, the reservoir's northernmost arm. South of Council Hill, the highway intersects Oklahoma State Highway 72 (SH-72) at its southern terminus. US 266 turns south-southeast, continuing the alignment of SH-72. The route then turns back to the east and heads into the city of Checotah. On the west side of town, US 266 has an interchange with the modern freeway route of U.S. Route 69 (US 69). Further east, in downtown Checotah, the route intersects the old alignment of US 69 (US 69 Business). The highway heads due east out of Checotah, descending a ridge and passing just south of its summit, Mt. Nebo. The highway passes under I-40 just before crossing into Muskogee County.

US 266 begins a concurrency with the state route (SH-2), traveling northwest to an interchange with I-40, numbered as Exit 278. The highways then curve around to due north to pass through Warner. On the north edge of Warner lies an intersection with US 64, where both US 266 and SH-2 end. Continuing straight puts the traveler on westbound US 64 towar Tulsa, while turning right brings the motorist onto eastbound US 64 toward Fort Smith, Arkansas.

History
Prior to the inception of the U.S. highway system, Oklahoma State Highway 9 (SH-9) covered much of the corridor from Oklahoma City to Spiro. Upon the US route system's inception, US 266 replaced SH-9 from its junction with US 66 at 23rd Street and Lincoln Boulevard in Oklahoma City to US 64 in Warner. By 1930, along with changes to several other branches of US 66, the route was truncated at Henryetta. The segment from Oklahoma City to Henryetta became part of US 62, which was commissioned in 1930.

Junction list
The entire route is in Oklahoma.

See also

 List of U.S. Highways in Oklahoma
 List of United States Numbered Highways

References

External links

 US-266 at USEnds.com
 US-266 at OKHighways.com

U.S. Route 266
U.S. Route 266
U.S. Route 266
U.S. Highways in Oklahoma
2
United States Numbered Highway System